The Valea Neagră is a right tributary of the river Siret in Romania. It discharges into the Siret near Hârlești.

References

Rivers of Romania
Rivers of Neamț County